Krips is a surname. Notable people with the surname include:

Henry Krips (conductor) (1912–1987), conductor and composer
Henry Krips (scholar), professor of cultural studies
Josef Krips, conductor and violinist
Michel Krips, mayor of the city of Dudelange